In music, Op. 77 stands for Opus number 77. Compositions that are assigned this number include:

 Arnold – Concerto for Two Violins and String Orchestra
 Brahms – Violin Concerto
 Britten – The Burning Fiery Furnace
 Dvořák – String Quintet No. 2
 Elgar – Une voix dans le désert
 Glazunov – Symphony No. 7
 Krenek – Cefalo e Procri
 Schumann – Lieder und Gesänge volume III (5 songs)
 Shostakovich – Violin Concerto No. 1
 Tchaikovsky – Fatum